Hohenfels Army Airfield  is a military airport near Hohenfels, a small town in Bavaria, Germany. It is part of the Hohenfels Training Area, which hosts the U.S. Army's Joint Multinational Readiness Center (JMRC). As part of JMRC, the airfield is used by helicopters in support of exercises held at the Hohenfels Training Area. It is also used as a refueling stop by Army helicopters transiting through Europe.

References

Airports in Bavaria
United States Army posts